Foote Field is a multi-purpose sports facility on the University of Alberta campus in Edmonton, Alberta, Canada, built as a legacy facility for the 2001 World Championships in Athletics. It was named for University of Alberta alumnus, former varsity track athlete, and philanthropist Eldon Foote, who donated $2 million toward the construction costs.

Design
Foote Field features two separate athletic fields on either side of a multi-purpose indoor facility. The East Field is a fully lit stadium that serves as home for the Alberta Golden Bears football. It features a CFL-sized surface, press box, electronic scoreboard, and has a capacity of 3,500 spectators. The East Field also features a four-lane, 125 m warm-up runway. In 2007, the field's older Astroturf surface was replaced with a newer type of hybrid artificial surface made by Astroturf LLC, called PureGrass.

The West Field is designed for track-and-field training and competition. It features a 400 m Beynon Sports running track, as well as separate areas for long jump/triple jump, high jump, pole vault, discus, hammer, shot put, and javelin. Inside the track is a natural-turf soccer field. Like the East Field, the West Field features a press box, electronic scoreboard, and has a capacity of 1,500 spectators.

Between the two fields is a multi-purpose indoor facility, which includes locker rooms, press box, and concession area. Other indoor facilities include classroom space, meeting rooms, and a high-performance weight-training area. The fitness centre is for the use of high-performance student-athletes only.

References

External links
 U of A Foote Field page
 Aerial view image of Foote Field

f
North American Soccer League stadiums
Soccer venues in Canada
Canadian football venues
Athletics (track and field) venues in Canada
Sports venues in Edmonton
University of Alberta buildings
University sports venues in Canada
University and college buildings completed in 2001
2001 establishments in Alberta